Pebble Creek is a census-designated place (CDP) in Hillsborough County, Florida, United States. The population was 9,624 at the 2020 census, up from 7,622 at the 2010 census. Pebble Creek is located in the unincorporated portion of New Tampa, and is primarily a residential zone.

Geography
Pebble Creek is located along the northern edge of Hillsborough County at  (28.150079, -82.344731). It is bordered to the east, south, and west by the city of Tampa and to the north by the Wesley Chapel CDP in Pasco County.

Demographics

As of the census of 2000, there were 4,824 people, 1,764 households, and 1,370 families residing in the community. The racial makeup of the community was 83.69% White, 6.09% African American, 0.21% Native American, 6.09% Asian, 0.08% Pacific Islander, 1.68% from other races, and 2.16% from two or more races. Hispanic or Latino of any race were 9.33% of the population.

There were 1,764 households, out of which 43.1% had children under the age of 18 living with them, 67.3% were married couples living together, 8.2% had a female householder with no husband present, and 22.3% were non-families. 17.4% of all households were made up of individuals, and 4.4% had someone living alone who was 65 years of age or older.  The average household size was 2.73 and the average family size was 3.10.

In the community the population was spread out, with 29.2% under the age of 18, 5.9% from 18 to 24, 34.5% from 25 to 44, 22.8% from 45 to 64, and 7.5% who were 65 years of age or older.  The median age was 36 years. For every 100 females, there were 94.5 males.  For every 100 females age 18 and over, there were 90.0 males.

The median income for a household in the community was $68,388, and the median income for a family was $73,909. Males had a median income of $50,694 versus $39,868 for females. The per capita income for the community was $28,319.  About 1.3% of families and 1.7% of the population were below the poverty line, including 2.2% of those under age 18 and none of those age 65 or over.

Pebble Creek consists of two master HOA's, Pebble Creek Homeowners Association of Hillsborough County, Inc.(PCHOA) and Pebble Creek Village HOA(PCV). PCHOA is the larger of the two with over 1,100 homes. PCV comprises just over 300 homes. Each HOA is responsible for their own community common space. PCHOA has a community center, pool, basketball court, tennis courts and many common area play spaces. PCV has non of these nor does it have access to the amenities located in PCHOA. While the HOA dues are considerably different between the two, PCHOA is much larger with all of the amenities available to their homeowners.

References

External links
City-Data.com - Pebble Creek, Florida

Census-designated places in Hillsborough County, Florida
Census-designated places in Florida